Pierre Marchand (born 11 November 1948) is a French fencer. He competed in the team épée event at the 1972 Summer Olympics.

References

External links
 

1948 births
Living people
French male épée fencers
Olympic fencers of France
Fencers at the 1972 Summer Olympics
20th-century French people